Armand Erwan Dsihounou Gnanduillet (born 13 February 1992) is a professional footballer who plays as a forward for Championnat National club Le Mans.

Both of Gnanduillet parents originate from the Ivory Coast. Armand Gnanduillet started playing football at CS Lanrelas in Brittany. He will join then the French clubs Le Havre and Poissy, Scottish Premiership club Heart of Midlothian, and was an Ivory Coast Under-20 international. He was named in the Ivory Coast squad for the 2011 CAF African Under-23 Championships.

Club career

France
His first steps on a football field were made at the CS Lanrelas in Brittany. Gnanduillet then joined Le Havre, where he failed to break into the first team but played 24 times for the reserves, scoring three goals. He moved from Le Havre to AS Poissy in 2012, where he went on to score five times in 11 games.

Chesterfield
Gnanduillet joined Chesterfield on 21 January 2013. He was handed a contract until the end of the season by Chesterfield boss Paul Cook after a trial.

He scored 39 minutes into his first competitive appearance for a Chesterfield XI against Belper Town in the Derbyshire Senior Cup. He then went on to score on his third league appearance for the Spireites, coming on as a half-time substitute for Mark Randall against AFC Wimbledon. Gnanduillet stroked a Danny Whitaker cross into the top corner to score his first goal in English football having played just 20 minutes' game time in League Two. He was handed his first start for the first team on 2 March 2013, at Dagenham & Redbridge.

Gnanduillet was given a two-year contract extension at the end of the 2012–13 season by Paul Cook. He scored the winning goal in the 96th minute of a 2–1 win against Southend United, converting Gary Roberts' corner with a powerful header, ending Southend's unbeaten start to the season. During a Skybet League 2 match against Burton Albion, Gnanduillet became dazed after a head collision with a Burton defender. However, he then went on to claim Chesterfield's Man of the Match award. He later went on to score the first of Chesterfield's two goals against York City after converting a penalty won by Gary Roberts. On 30 August 2014, following a match at Port Vale, it was reported that Gnanduillet had suffered alleged racist abuse after reacting to something shouted at him by a Port Vale fan as the teams left the pitch. Chesterfield, Port Vale and Staffordshire Police launched an investigation into the incident.

On 20 October 2014, Gnanduillet joined League Two side Tranmere Rovers on a one-month loan, and in March 2015 he signed on loan for Oxford United until the end of the season. He made four substitute appearances for Oxford before being recalled early by his parent club.

Leyton Orient
On 22 January 2016, Gnanduillet joined Leyton Orient for an undisclosed fee.

Blackpool
On 19 August 2016, Gnanduillet joined Blackpool on a two-year contract. After two years, he joined South African side Baroka before returning to Blackpool two months later. He was the club's top goalscorer, with fourteen in all competitions, in 2018–19. He was released in June 2020.

Altay
On 12 August 2020, Gnanduillet signed for Turkish second division side Altay on a one-year deal. On 29 December 2020, after just 4 months at the club, Gnanduillet left Atlay by mutual consent. He had scored 2 goals in 15 appearances during his short spell at the Turkish club.

Heart of Midlothian
Gnanduillet joined Scottish Championship club Heart of Midlothian on an 18-month deal on 25 January 2021. He scored twice on his debut away to Raith Rovers after coming on as a 60th minute substitute.  His first season in Scotland ended in success as Hearts won promotion back to the Scottish Premiership.

Le Mans 
On 21 January 2022, Gnanduillet left Hearts after 12 months and signed a permanent deal with Championnat National club Le Mans.

International career
Gnanduillet has previously represented Ivory Coast at under-20 international level.

Career statistics

Honours
Blackpool
EFL League Two play-offs: 2017

Heart of Midlothian
Scottish Championship: 2020–21

Individual
PFA League One Team of the Year: 2019–20

References

External links

1992 births
Living people
Sportspeople from Angers
Citizens of Ivory Coast through descent
Ivorian footballers
Ivory Coast under-20 international footballers
French footballers
French sportspeople of Ivorian descent
Association football forwards
Le Havre AC players
AS Poissy players
Chesterfield F.C. players
Stevenage F.C. players
Oxford United F.C. players
Tranmere Rovers F.C. players
Leyton Orient F.C. players
Blackpool F.C. players
Baroka F.C. players
Altay S.K. footballers
Heart of Midlothian F.C. players
Le Mans FC players
English Football League players
TFF First League players
Scottish Professional Football League players
Expatriate footballers in England
Expatriate footballers in Turkey
Expatriate footballers in Scotland
Footballers from Pays de la Loire